Guillaume Van Keirsbulck (born 14 February 1991) is a Belgian professional road bicycle racer, who currently rides for UCI ProTeam .

Career
Born in Roeselare, Van Keirsbulck is the grandson of Benoni Beheyt and got his first major win in 2011 when winning the Omloop van het Houtland. In June 2017, he was named in the startlist for the 2017 Tour de France.

Major results

2008
 8th Time trial, UEC European Junior Road Championships
2009
 1st Paris–Roubaix Juniors
 6th Overall Internationale Junioren-rundfahrt Niedersachsen
1st Stage 2 (ITT)
2010
 3rd Time trial, National Under-23 Road Championships
2011
 1st Omloop van het Houtland
 1st GP Briek Schotte
 3rd Grote Prijs Jef Scherens
 4th Le Samyn
 7th Halle–Ingooigem
2012
 4th Overall Tour de l'Eurométropole
1st  Young rider classification
2013
 1st Stage 1 (TTT) Tirreno–Adriatico
 6th Gullegem Koerse
 8th Heistse Pijl
 9th Overall Three Days of De Panne
2014
 1st  Overall Three Days of De Panne
 1st Stage 7 Eneco Tour
 2nd Overall Driedaagse van West-Vlaanderen
1st  Young rider classification
1st Stage 2
 7th Overall Tour of Qatar
1st  Young rider classification
 7th Kuurne–Brussels–Kuurne
2015
 5th Dwars door Vlaanderen
 8th Ronde van Zeeland Seaports
2017
 1st Le Samyn
 5th Dwars door West-Vlaanderen
 7th Grote Prijs Marcel Kint
 10th De Kustpijl
  Combativity award Stage 4 Tour de France
2018
 1st Antwerp Port Epic
 6th Dwars door West–Vlaanderen

Grand Tour general classification results timeline

References

External links

Tour de France 2017 profile

Belgian male cyclists
Living people
1991 births
People from Roeselare
Sportspeople from West Flanders